The 1973 Braintree District Council election took place on 7 June 1973 to elect members of Braintree District Council in England. This was on the same day as other local elections.

This was the inaugural election of Braintree District Council.

Summary

Election result

|}

Ward results

Black Notley

Bumpstead

Castle Headingham

Coggeshall

Colne Engaine & Greenstead Green

Cressing

Earls Colne

Gosfield

Halstead Holy Trinity

Halstead St. Andrew's

Hatfield Peverel

Kelvedon

No. 1 (Braintree: East)

No. 2 (Braintree: West)

No. 3 (Bocking: North)

No. 4 (Bocking: South)

No. 7 (Witham: West)

No. 8 (Witham: North)

No. 9 (Witham: Rivenhall North)

No. 10 (Witham: Rivenhall South)

No. 11 (Witham: Central)

No. 12 (Witham: South)

Panfield

Rayne

Sible Headingham

Stour Valley Central

Stour Valley North

Stour Valley South

Terling

Three Fields

Upper Colne

Yeldham

References

Braintree District Council elections
1973 English local elections
May 1973 events in the United Kingdom
1970s in Essex